Ilie Ceaușescu (8 June 1926 – 1 October 2002) was a Romanian army general and communist politician who was Deputy Defence Minister of Communist Romania during the rule of his older brother, Nicolae Ceaușescu.

Ilie's military and political career was helped by Nicolae; between 1980 and 1989, he was a member of the Central Committee of the Romanian Communist Party, and, in 1982-1989, he was Deputy Minister of Defense.

Ilie Ceaușescu was also a historian, and he influenced Nicolae in establishing protochronism as Romania's official historiography and an important part of the national propaganda system. For instance, he claimed that the Romanian people have been always the same since time immemorial, being very little influenced by other people (Romans, Slavs, Mongols) etc.:

After the Romanian Revolution and the execution of Nicolae Ceaușescu, in 1990 it was claimed that both Ilie Ceaușescu and Marin Ceaușescu was involved in a series of transactions between the United States and Romania, which consisted of selling Soviet military technology. The deal was worth $40 million, part of which was allegedly deposited in Swiss bank accounts. However, Ilie Ceaușescu rejected that.

After his release he retired from public life, and died 13 years later at the age of 76.


Works

English 
 The entire people's war for the homeland's defence with the Romanians: From times of yore to present days, Military Publishing House, Bucharest, 1980
 Transylvania, an ancient Romanian land, Military Publishing House, Bucharest, 1983
 23 August 1944: 200 days spared from World War II, Editura Științifică și Enciclopedică, 1984
 From the Dacian state to socialist Romania: 2,000 years of statehood, Military Publishing House, Bucharest, 1985
 A Turning Point in World War II, East European Monographs, Boulder, 1985 
 Independence - a fundamental aim of the Romanian people: Traditions, present features, prospects Military Publishing House, Bucharest, 1987
 Romanian Military Doctrine, East European Monographs, Boulder, 1988

Romanian 
 Transilvania: Străvechi pamînt românesc, Ed. Militară, Bucharest, 1984 (with Florin Constantiniu and Mihail E. Ionescu)
 Mobilitate socială, Ed. Academiei, Bucharest, 1973

Notes

References 
 Katherine Verdery, National Ideology under Socialism. Identity and Cultural Politics in Ceaușescu's Romania, University of California Press, Berkeley, 1991 

1926 births
2002 deaths
Ilie
Romanian communists
Romanian Land Forces generals
20th-century Romanian historians